A parking lot is a cleared area that is intended for parking vehicles.

Parking lot or minor variations thereof may also refer to:

Transportation 
 Green parking lot: a form of parking lot designed to be environmentally more sustainable

Arts and entertainment

Films 
 The Parking Lot Movie: a 2010 documentary film

Albums 
 Parking Lots (album): a 2005 album by Mia Dyson

Songs 
 "Parking Lot" (Nivea song): a 2005 single by Nivea
 "Parking Lot" (Nelly Furtado song): a 2012 single by Nelly Furtado
 "Parking Lot Party": a 2013 song by Lee Brice
 "Parking Lot" (skit): a 2013 skit by Eminem
 "Parking Lot" (Blink-182 song): a 2017 promotional single by Blink-182